Heinert is a German surname, a variant of Heiner; the surname may refer to the following notable people:
Pat Heinert, American politician
Ralph Heinert, American engineer and politician 
Troy Heinert (born 1972), American politician

References

German-language surnames